Svend Aage Jensby (born 10 September 1940) is a Danish politician representing the Liberal Party. He was Defence Minister in the Cabinet of Anders Fogh Rasmussen I from 27 November 2001 to 24 April 2004, when he was forced to resign and was replaced by Søren Gade. He was a member of parliament (Folketinget) from 12 December 1990 to February 2005.

References
CV - From Folketinget.

1940 births
Danish Defence Ministers
Living people
Members of the Folketing
People from Aarhus